Mustapha Adib may refer to:

Mustapha Adib (activist) (born 1968), Moroccan human rights activist and ex-captain in the Royal Moroccan Air Force
Mustapha Adib (diplomat) (born 1972), Lebanese diplomat, lawyer, educator, politician, researcher, academic and former Prime Minister-designate of Lebanon